HD 43848 is a 9th magnitude K-type subgiant star located approximately 123 light-years away in the constellation of Columba. The star is less massive than the Sun.

On October 29, 2008, radial velocity measurements made with the MIKE echelle spectrograph on the 6.5-m Magellan II (Clay) telescope revealed the presence of a companion of at least 25 Jupiter masses orbiting the star. Initially thought to be a brown dwarf, astrometric measurements reveal that the true mass of the object is 120 Jupiter masses, implying that it is likely to be a red dwarf star.

See also 

 BD-17°63 b
 HD 131664
 HD 145377 b
 HD 153950 b
 HD 20868 b
 HD 73267 b

References 

K-type subgiants
043848
029804
Columba (constellation)
M-type main-sequence stars
Durchmusterung objects